State Trunk Highway 104 (often called Highway 104, STH-104 or WIS 104) is a state highway in the US state of Wisconsin. It runs in a north–south direction in south central Wisconsin from Brodhead to Brooklyn. It was first designated in 1919–1920 before being rerouted in 1923–1926 and extended in 1999.

Route description
WIS 104 is a two-lane undivided highway for its entire length, travelling straight north-south along the Green County line from WIS 11 in Brodhead to WIS 92 in Brooklyn. Starting at Brodhead as a continuation of County Trunk Highway T (CTH-T), WIS 104 begins to travel northward from WIS 11 and CTH-T. Then, after , it runs concurrently with WIS 59. After leaving the concurrency, it then travels under  before a short,  concurrency with CTH-C after which it travels another  before ending at WIS 92 in Brooklyn. The road continues north as CTH-MM.

History
WIS 104 was first designated in 1919–1920, running along its current route north of Broadhead before turning east then north to WIS 10 in Evansville. In 1923–1926, the highway was rerouted, removing all of its sections not on the current route and adding a short section to connect to WIS 59.

Major intersections
The entire highway is along the Green county line.

See also

References

External links

104
Transportation in Green County, Wisconsin
Transportation in Rock County, Wisconsin
Transportation in Dane County, Wisconsin